Ali Sedat Özden (born 30 August 1953), better known as Sedat Özden, is a Turkish retired professional football player who played as a midfielder. A one club man for Bursaspor, Sedat is considered a legend of the club for his loyalty and consistent performances over his 13 years with the club.

International career
Sedat made his first appearance with the Turkey national football team in a Balkans Cup 4-0 loss to Romania on 23 March 1977. He ended up making 34 total appearances for Turkey, the last in 1985.

Managerial career
Shortly after his retirement, Sedat briefly managed Buraspor in 1986.

References

External links
 
 
 

Living people
1953 births
Sportspeople from Bursa
Turkish footballers
Turkey international footballers
Turkey youth international footballers
Süper Lig players
Bursaspor footballers
Association football midfielders
Turkish football managers